Frederick Lindsay  (born March 12, 1946) is a politician and was a provincial Member of the Legislative Assembly (MLA) in Alberta, Canada.

Political involvement
Lindsay has been a longtime Progressive Conservative, having served on the Stony Plain board of directors for the last 25 years. He sought election after longtime member Stan Woloshyn retired from the Legislative Assembly of Alberta in 2004.

Lindsay was elected to his first term as the Progressive Conservative member for Stony Plain provincial electoral district in the 2004 Alberta general election. He was re-elected to a second term in the 2008 election.

On December 14, 2006, Lindsay was appointed to the cabinet as Solicitor General and Minister of Public Security, when Ed Stelmach became Premier. He served in the job until January 13, 2010.

Electoral record

2004 Alberta general election

References

External links
Fred Lindsay biography Alberta legislature

Progressive Conservative Association of Alberta MLAs
Living people
Year of birth uncertain
Members of the Executive Council of Alberta
1946 births
21st-century Canadian politicians